{{Speciesbox
| image = 
| image_caption = 
| genus = Cryptoditha
| species = elegans
| authority = Beier, 1931
| synonyms = 
 Tridenchthonius elegans Beier, 1931
 Cryptoditha elegans (Beier)
 Cryptoditha cf. elegans (Beier)
}}Cryptoditha elegans'' is a species of pseudoscorpions. It is found in Brazil. The type locality is Passa Quatro, Minais Gerais.

References

External links 
 
 Cryptoditha elegans at museum.wa.gov.au

Tridenchthoniidae
Animals described in 1931
Arthropods of Brazil